Sadettin Kaynak (1895 – 3 February 1961) was a prominent composer of Turkish classical music.

Biography
Born in Istanbul, he became a hafiz at a young age. He lost his father early in his youth. He completed his music education at the Istanbul University. Later, he traveled to south east Anatolia and researched Turkish folk music there. He was supported by the new republic; he was one of the most important composers of Turkish classical music. He introduced western concepts in unique "makams" (movements). He wholeheartedly supported the reforms introduced by Atatürk. Being an Imam, he was one of the first open-minded religious people reciting "Muslim prayers call known as Ezan" in pure Turkish. He composed over 300 songs in classical Turkish music. He had a stroke in 1955, and lived paralyzed until his death on 3 February 1961. He was buried at Merkezefendi Cemetery.

Major works
Below is a list of some of his compositions with the associated makam. He has got 330 composition in 42 different makam.

Dertliyim ruhuma hicranını (segah-nihavend)
Bir esmer dilberin vuruldum hüsnüne (kürdilihicazkar)
Leyla (hicazkar)
Enginde yavaş yavaş (hicaz)
Kalplerden dudaklara (nihavent)
Ben güzele güzel demem (mahur)
Batan gün kana benziyor (muhayyer)
Çıkar yücelerden haber sorarım (hüzzam).

See also
Laïkó

References

 InleyenNagmeler.com - Many Different Biographies of Saadettin Kaynak
 Biyografi.net - Biography of Sadettin Kaynak

1895 births
1961 deaths
Musicians from Istanbul
Turkish classical composers
Composers of Ottoman classical music
Composers of Turkish makam music
Musicians of Ottoman classical music
Musicians of Turkish makam music
20th-century classical composers
Male classical composers
Darülfünun alumni
20th-century male musicians